John Lecky can refer to:

 John Lecky (rower)
 John Lecky (rugby union, born 1863)
 John Lecky (rugby union, born 1960)